The Battle of Linqu was a battle fought in 409 between the Southern Yan and Eastern Jin dynasties during the Sixteen Kingdoms period of Chinese history. The battle ended in a decisive victory for the Eastern Jin, who went on to besiege the Southern Yan capital and eventually fully conquer Southern Yan.

Prelude 
Conflict between the Southern Yan and Eastern Jin began in 399 when Murong De, leader of the Southern Yan, attacked and conquered the Eastern Jin Qing Province (which corresponds to modern central and eastern Shandong) following the conquest of Southern Yan’s previous territory by the Northern Wei. At the time the Jin were struggling with internal problems and rebellions and so didn’t take any military action against Southern Yan. Following Murong De’s death he was succeeded by Murong Chao, who was forced to become a vassal to the Later Qin in return for his wife and mother, who were stranded in Later Qin. Another clause in this agreement was that Murong Chao was forced to give his court musicians to Later Qin and so in 409 Murong Chao decided to raid Jin territory and capture people to be trained as new musicians. This raid was very successful and so Murong Chao would later launch numerous further raids into Jin territory as well. However Jin was in a better state than it had been in 399 and the Jin regent Liu Yu decided to launch an invasion of Southern Yan. Upon hearing of the planned invasion, the main Southern Yan generals proposed that their army defend Daxian Mountain (next to modern Weifang) however Murong Chao rejected this idea, wanting to engage his enemy in the plains as he had the superior cavalry. Liu Yu entered Shandong and met the Southern Yan army outside the city of Linqu.

Battle 
Liu Yu knew that the main advantage Southern Yan had was their much superior cavalry and so to counter this he formed his chariots into two walls on either side of his army and stationed some of his men to defend them. When the Southern Yan cavalry charged they were unable to break through the chariots, meanwhile the infantry of both sides were equal and so the battle developed into a stalemate. Liu Yu decided to send some of his men on a large flanking manoeuvre which appeared on another side of Linqu’s walls and attempted to enter the city. The Southern Yan however believed that this was a whole new army and began to panic and soon the army broke and fled, ending the battle.

Aftermath 
Liu Yu would go on to besiege Guanggu, the capital of Southern Yan, which would fall in early 410. Murong Chao as well as many other Southern Yan nobles were captured and executed and Southern Yan was completely annexed by Jin. Liu Yu would go on to overthrow the Jin and found the short lived Liu Song state.

References 

409